Solihull Metropolitan Borough Council is the local council of the Metropolitan Borough of Solihull in the West Midlands, England. It is a metropolitan district council, one of seven in the West Midlands and one of 36 in the metropolitan counties of England, and provides the majority of local government services in Solihull.

The council consists of 51 councillors who are elected by the local community. Councillors determine matters of policy on behalf of the local community and make key decisions, such as the annual budget and Council Tax.

Whilst the elected councillors decide the policies, council officers put them into practice. The council employs approximately 8,000 officers to give advice, implement decisions and manage the day to day delivery of its services.

Politics
The Conservative Party is the controlling party in Solihull. They have had the majority of councillors since the 2011 local elections replacing a previous Labour Party and Liberal Democrat coalition in the borough.

Solihull is also notable for the Green Party having been the main opposition since 2014. They had first gained the six seats in Smith's Wood and Chelmsley Wood wards from the Labour Party in the 2011, 2012 and 2014 Local Elections, and seats in Shirley South in 2014 and Shirley West in 2012 and 2014. In 2018 they won their first seat in Castle Bromwich, from the Conservatives. In 2021 the Greens gained a seat in the last ward still electing Labour councillors, Kingshurst and Fordbridge. In October 2021, the last two Labour councillors defected, one to the Conservatives and one to the Green Party, leaving Solihull as the only Metropolitan Borough Council in England without any Labour Party councillors.

Recent history

Solihull Council appointed Nick Page as their Chief executive on 1 July 2014. He had previously spent five years at Salford City Council and had overseen the complete restructure of Children's Services there.

See also
Solihull Metropolitan Borough Council elections

References

Metropolitan district councils of England
Local authorities in the West Midlands (county)
Leader and cabinet executives
Local education authorities in England
Billing authorities in England
1974 establishments in England
Metropolitan Borough Council